Myriam Adam (born July 11, 1993) is a former paracyclist from Canada that competed mainly in category H1-2W events. She is from Saint-Jean-sur-Richelieu, Quebec.

Athletics
In April 2010, she participated at the 2010 UCI Para-Cycling Road World Championships, obtaining two silver medals.
At the 2011 Parapan Am Games in Guadalajara, Mexico, Myriam captured the gold medal in the hand cycle division.

Ice sledge hockey
For the 2015–16 season, Myriam was named to the roster of the Canada women's national ice sledge hockey team.

Of note, Myriam was part of the Quebec provincial women's ice sledge hockey team that competed at the Challenge Hivernal Adaptavie in February 2015.

References

1993 births
Living people
Canadian sledge hockey players
People from Saint-Jean-sur-Richelieu
Cyclists from Quebec
Canadian female wheelchair racers
Olympic wheelchair racers of Canada
Canadian sportswomen
French Quebecers
Medalists at the 2011 Parapan American Games